Sigurdson is a surname. Notable people with the surname include:

Auburn Sigurdson (born 1981), Canadian softball pitcher
Hal Sigurdson (1932–2012), Canadian sports journalist
Larus Sigurdson (born 1973), Icelandic professional footballer who plays as a defender
Lori Sigurdson (born 1961), Alberta member of the provincial legislature
Stefan Sigurdson, candidate for councillor in the Winnipeg municipal election, 1995
Tom Sigurdson (born 1957), former Canadian provincial level politician

See also
Sigurdsson